Dato' Mohamed Zaki (born 20 February 1953), also known as Nazaki Zaki or Sandhaanu Zaki, is a businessman and politician in the Maldives.

Zaki is the founder of Nazaki Services Pvt Ltd, which is a company in the Maldives to the extent that all local news media refer to him as Nazaki Zaki. While being a businessman, he was also a part-time politician in the opposition party MDP Maldivian Democratic Party. He is among the few political figures in the Maldives who had stood up against a corrupt government during the time when there was no freedom of speech in the country. The struggle that he and others had undergone has made a political impact within four to five years.

In 2007, Maldivians were able to speak openly against the government and the police without the fear of being arrested, beaten, or tortured. This was a complete change compared to 2003. In October 2008, the first Maldivian democratic presidential elections were held, where people voted for a change in government, causing the Maldivian Democratic Party presidential candidate Mohamed Nasheed to be the new incoming president. As government posts are decided by the president, Mohamed Zaki was appointed the new Maldivian High Commissioner to Malaysia, Ambassador to Indonesia and Thailand, and High Commissioner to Brunei in 2008.

During his youth, Zaki had struggled to earn money and support his family. However he had supported his wife (Nazima Asir) together with his five children and established one of the biggest companies in the Maldives.

His son Muad Mohamed Zaki has raised his political profile in the country after being one of the senior Maldivian Democratic Party members that was arrested in the military crackdown on peaceful protesters. The day of the crackdown was later labelled as Black Friday in the Maldives.

Both has moved on to give their support to a government that is based on national unity and Islam in the Maldives.

He has long-standing high political and business relations with the government led by President Abdulla Yameen and has given his support to the president's vision to develop the country. Zaki's political influence and credibility in the country has extended to the past two presidents before President Yameen. His backing of any president or political party has always been seen as a boost to their credibility in the eyes of many locals that respect him for his international achievements in life.

References

External links 

 Nazaki Services Pvt. Ltd
 Detailed information received by Amnesty International about the trial of Mohamed Zaki, Ibrahim Luthfee, Ahmed Didi and Fathimath Nisreen
 Cyber-dissident Mohamed Zaki freed
 Malaysian king confers Dato' title to Nazaki Zaki
 Maldivian Ambassador Presents his Credentials to the President of Indonesia
 High Commissioner seeks more opportunities for Maldivian students
 Non Resident Ambassador visits Thailand
 High Commissioner pays a courtesy call on the Former Prime Minister of Malaysia
 Maldivian High Commissioner Presents his Credentials to His Majesty Sultan of Brunei Darussalam
 Deputy Foreign Minister Dato’ Lee Chee Leong highlights Malaysian govt’s bilateral cooperation with the Maldives Government

1953 births
Living people
Maldivian Democratic Party politicians
Maldivian businesspeople
High Commissioners of the Maldives to Malaysia